Luman W. Aldrich (September 1852 – October 16, 1916) was an American football player and coach. He served as a player-coach at Tufts University in Boston, Massachusetts from 1875 to 1877, compiling a record of 3–1–1. He attended the Boston University School of Law.

References

External links
 

1852 births
1916 deaths
19th-century players of American football
Player-coaches
Tufts Jumbos football coaches
Tufts Jumbos football players
Boston University School of Law alumni
People from Shrewsbury, Vermont
Players of American football from Vermont